Sidalcea ranunculacea is a species of flowering plant in the mallow family known by the common name marsh checkerbloom and marsh checker mallow.

Description
The plant is endemic to California, known only within Tulare County and Kern County. Many populations are within the Sequoia National Forest, Sequoia National Park, or Kings Canyon National Park.

It grows in moist areas, such as wet meadows and on stream banks, in yellow pine forest, red fir forest, lodgepole forest habitats.

Description
It is coated in hairs, the lower ones becoming bristly. The fleshy lobed leaf blades also have hairs and bristles.

The inflorescence is a dense, spikelike cluster or series of clusters of flowers. Each flower has five pink to purple petals up to 1.5 centimeters long. The blooming period is June to August.

See also

References

External links
Calflora Database: Sidalcea ranunculacea (Marsh checker mallow, Marsh checkerbloom)
Jepson Manual eFlora (TJM2) treatment of Sidalcea ranunculacea
USDA Plants Profile for Sidalcea ranunculacea
UC CalPhotos gallery: Sidalcea ranunculacea

ranunculacea
Endemic flora of California
Flora of the Sierra Nevada (United States)
Greenhorn Mountains
Natural history of Kern County, California
Natural history of Tulare County, California
~
Flora without expected TNC conservation status